is a passenger railway station in the town of Kōzaki, Chiba Japan, operated by the East Japan Railway Company (JR East).

Lines
Shimōsa-Kōzaki Station is served by the Narita Line, and is located 31.6 kilometers from the terminus of line at Sakura Station.

Station layout
Shimōsa-Kōzaki Station consists of dual opposed side platforms connected by a footbridge. The station building is adjacent to Platform 1. The station is staffed.

Platforms

History
The Narita Railway was nationalised on September 1, 1920, becoming part of the Japanese Government Railway (JGR). The station was renamed to its present name on April 1, 1957. After World War II, the JGR became the Japan National Railways (JNR). Scheduled freight operations were suspended from April 1, 1971. The station was absorbed into the JR East network upon the privatization of the Japan National Railways (JNR) on April 1, 1987. The station building was rebuilt in 1998.

Passenger statistics
In fiscal 2019, the station was used by an average of 793 passengers daily (boarding passengers only).

Surrounding area
Ōsugi Shrine, also known as "Ambasama"
 Kozaki Town Hall
 Kozaki Municipal Kanzaki Junior High School

See also
 List of railway stations in Japan

References

External links

JR East station information 

Railway stations in Japan opened in 1898
Railway stations in Chiba Prefecture
Narita Line
Kōzaki